So Cute is a 2004 South Korean drama film about four men on the margins of society who fall in love with the same woman. It was selected to screen at the Pusan International Film Festival, the 2005 Brisbane International Film Festival and the 26th Moscow International Film Festival. It marked the acting debut of director Jang Sun-woo.

Plot
Jang Su-ro lives in the slums of Korea with his three sons 963, Dog Nose and So-and-So, who just got out of prison. While So-and-So's loyalties to his mob boss and biological family are put to the test when he finds that his family's home is slated to be demolished by the mob's developers, the rest of the family's life is complicated with the arrival of Sun-yi, Jang's new girlfriend who annoys Dog Nose and attracts the affections of 963.

References

External links
 
 

2004 films
2004 drama films
2000s Korean-language films
South Korean drama films
2000s South Korean films